The 1925–26 SK Rapid Wien season was the 28th season in club history.

Squad

Squad and statistics

Squad statistics

Fixtures and results

League

Cup

References

1925-26 Rapid Wien Season
Rapid